AJM may refer to:
 Distinguished Young Women, formerly known as America's Junior Miss
Air Jamaica (ICAO airline designator AJM)
 Abrasive jet machining
 American Journal of Mathematics
 Association des Juristes Maliennes, an association of women jurists in Mali
 Australian Jazz Museum